The Cochin Bridge spans Lehman Creek in Cochin, Saskatchewan, Canada. Lehman Creek is a channel that connects Jackfish Lake and Murray Lake. The bridge was originally referred to as Jackfish Lake Narrows Bridge.  The bridge was constructed by  John Kenward  (a concrete contractor from Regina) based on a James Barney Marsh double arch design.  The bridge served as the main entrance into Cochin as part of Saskatchewan Highway 4 until 1962 when a new bridge was constructed and the highway realigned.   The bridge continued to serve local traffic until 1989 when it became a pedestrian only bridge.

There is another Cochin Bridge This bridge and the rail line to Kochi were completed in 1902 at the cost of 84 lakh rupees by Shri Rama Varma Thampuran, the farsighted Maharaja of Kochi, who reigned from the year 1895 till 1914. It was the first to ford this river that obstructed passage between Malabar and the southern states of Kochi/Travancore. The first freight train passed over the bridge on 2 June 1902 and a few days later on the 16th the first passenger train made the journey from Shornur to Kochi on this line.

See also
List of bridges in Canada

References

Bridges completed in 1926
Bridges in Saskatchewan
Pedestrian bridges in Canada
1926 establishments in Saskatchewan